"Noblesse Oblige" is the fourteenth episode of the fifth and final series of the period drama Upstairs, Downstairs. It first aired on 7 December 1975 on ITV.

Background
Noblesse Oblige was recorded in the studio on 24 and 25 July 1975.

Cast
Angela Baddeley - Mrs Bridges
Lesley-Anne Down - Georgina Worsley
David Langton - Richard Bellamy
Ursula Howells - Duchess of Buckminster
Christopher Beeny - Edward
Jacqueline Tong - Daisy
Jenny Tomasin - Ruby
Anthony Andrews - Robert, Marquess of Stockbridge
Elaine Donnelly - Mabel
Joan Sanderson - Mrs Waddilove
Deddie Davies - Mrs Tibbitt
Frank Duncan - Wireless Announcer

Plot
It is June 1929, and Georgina and Lord Stockbridge are seeing a lot of each other. He admits to being in love with her and she admits the same. When Stockbridge proposes, Georgina accepts. His mother, the Duchess of Buckminster, tells Robert that she and the Duke disapprove. This is mainly because of the inquest and the press coverage Georgina has received over the years. However, a few days later Georgina is invited to tea with the Duchess, who tells Georgina that she and the Duke are sending Robert around the World for one year. They feel that their son is not yet ready to marry or to run their large estate. When Georgina and Robert next meet, they agree to marry in exactly one years time, 12 June 1930.

Meanwhile, after getting fed up with Mrs Bridges' constant rudeness to her, Ruby leaves Eaton Place during the night. She then writes to Richard Bellamy to ask for a reference, and gets a job as a cook-general on £46 a year. In Lady Bellamy's absence, Georgina interviews Mabel Wilks as replacement for Ruby, and she is soon employed. However, Mabel is not afraid to be insubordinate to Mrs Bridges, and is rude to everyone. Ruby's new mistress in the recently-developed north west London suburb of Ruislip, Mrs Gladys Waddilove, is a bully who treats her as a maid of all work, and makes her pay for breakages. When Mrs Bridges reads a letter from Ruby to Daisy, sensing she is unhappy, she visits Ruby. After hearing how exhausted Ruby is from the amount of work she must do, and witnessing Mrs Waddilove's abusive treatment of Ruby, Mrs Bridges brings Ruby back to Eaton Place, and sacks Mabel.

Following the 1929 general election, Richard loses his Government post but remains in the House of Lords.

Footnotes

References
Richard Marson, "Inside UpDown - The Story of Upstairs, Downstairs", Kaleidoscope Publishing, 2005
Updown.org.uk - Upstairs, Downstairs Fansite

Upstairs, Downstairs (series 5) episodes
1975 British television episodes
Fiction set in 1929